Babu Gopinath Singh was an Indian politician. He was a Member of Parliament, representing Uttar Pradesh in the Rajya Sabha the upper house of India's Parliament as a member of the Indian National Congress

References

Rajya Sabha members from Uttar Pradesh
Indian National Congress politicians
1901 births
1967 deaths
Indian National Congress politicians from Uttar Pradesh